The 2019 European Figure Skating Championships took place in Minsk, Belarus. Medals were awarded in the disciplines of men's singles, ladies' singles, pairs, and ice dancing.

Records 

The following new ISU best scores were set during this competition:

Qualification 
Skaters were eligible for the event if they represent a European member nation of the International Skating Union and have reached the age of 15 before 1 July 2018, in their place of birth. The corresponding competition for non-European skaters was the 2019 Four Continents Championships. National associations selected their entries according to their own criteria, but the ISU mandated that their selections achieve a minimum technical elements score (TES) at an international event prior to the European Championships.

Minimum TES 
The ISU stipulates that the minimum scores must be achieved at an ISU-recognized senior international competition in the ongoing or preceding season, no later than 21 days before the first official practice day.

Number of entries per discipline 
Based on the results of the 2018 European Championships, the ISU allows each country one to three entries per discipline.

Entries 
Member nations began announcing their selections in December 2018. The International Skating Union published a complete list of entries on 3 January 2019.

Changes to preliminary assignments

Results

Men

Ladies

Pairs

Ice dancing

Medals summary

Medalists
Medals awarded to the skaters who achieve the highest overall placements in each discipline:

Small medals awarded to the skaters who achieve the highest short program or rhythm dance placements in each discipline:

Medals awarded to the skaters who achieve the highest free skating or free dance placements in each discipline:

Medals by country
Table of medals for overall placement:

Table of small medals for placement in the short segment:

Table of small medals for placement in the free segment:

Prize money
Prize money is awarded to skaters who achieve a Top 6 placement in each discipline as follows:

See also

References

External links 
 2019 European Championships at the International Skating Union
http://www.isuresults.com/results/season1819/ec2019/index.htm

European Figure Skating Championships
2019 in figure skating
2019 in Belarusian sport
Sports competitions in Minsk
2010s in Minsk
International figure skating competitions hosted by Belarus
European Figure Skating Championships